Attila Pintér (born 8 September 1978) is a Hungarian football player who currently plays for Pécsi Mecsek FC.

References
Profile at HLSZ

1978 births
Living people
Hungarian footballers
Association football defenders
Kecskeméti TE players
BKV Előre SC footballers
Nyíregyháza Spartacus FC players
Kaposvári Rákóczi FC players
Győri ETO FC players
Paksi FC players
Pécsi MFC players
Kozármisleny SE footballers